The 1971–72 NBA season was the Hawks' 23rd season in the NBA and fourth season in Atlanta.

Offseason

Draft picks

Roster

Regular season

Season standings

z – clinched division title
y – clinched division title
x – clinched playoff spot

Record vs. opponents

Game log

Playoffs

|- align="center" bgcolor="#ffcccc"
| 1
| March 29
| @ Boston
| L 108–126
| Lou Hudson (29)
| Don Adams (12)
| Herm Gilliam (8)
| Boston Garden12,815
| 0–1
|- align="center" bgcolor="#ccffcc"
| 2
| March 31
| Boston
| W 113–104
| Lou Hudson (41)
| Walt Bellamy (18)
| Herm Gilliam (9)
| Alexander Memorial Coliseum6,955
| 1–1
|- align="center" bgcolor="#ffcccc"
| 3
| April 2
| @ Boston
| L 113–136
| Pete Maravich (37)
| Jim Washington (11)
| Pete Maravich (6)
| Boston Garden12,094
| 1–2
|- align="center" bgcolor="#ccffcc"
| 4
| April 4
| Boston
| W 112–110
| Pete Maravich (36)
| Walt Bellamy (15)
| Don Adams (4)
| Alexander Memorial Coliseum7,192
| 2–2
|- align="center" bgcolor="#ffcccc"
| 5
| April 7
| @ Boston
| L 114–124
| three players tied (21)
| Walt Bellamy (13)
| Pete Maravich (8)
| Boston Garden15,315
| 2–3
|- align="center" bgcolor="#ffcccc"
| 6
| April 9
| Boston
| L 118–127
| Pete Maravich (37)
| Walt Bellamy (15)
| Pete Maravich (5)
| Alexander Memorial Coliseum7,192
| 2–4
|-

References

Atlanta
Atlanta Hawks seasons
Atlanta
Atlanta